The Toyota Aygo is a city car (A-segment) marketed by Toyota mainly in the European market between 2005 and 2022 across two generations. The Aygo was first displayed at the 2005 Geneva International Motor Show. It was built alongside the related Citroën C1 and Peugeot 107/108 at the Toyota Peugeot Citroën Automobile Czech (TPCA) joint venture in Kolín, Czech Republic. The Aygo's production ended in 2021 and was replaced by the crossover-styled Aygo X.

The name "Aygo" comes from "i-go", symbolising freedom and mobility.



First generation (AB10/AB20/AB30; 2005) 

The decision to produce the cars was made on 12 July 2001 when the presidents of Toyota and PSA Peugeot Citroën, Fujio Cho and Jean-Martin Folz respectively, decided to produce a small car to share development costs. This project was called B-Zero. The Peugeot 107 and Citroën C1 are rebadged versions of the same car.

The main difference between the Aygo and its French siblings are badging, rear side windows, steering wheel, and the easily recognizable front and rear treatments. The planned production was 300,000 cars annually – 100,000 cars per brand. Sales began in July 2005, and the car was available as a three- or five-door hatchback.

The Aygo was used on BBC's Top Gear in a giant match of football, showcasing its maneuverability. The Top Gear presenters deemed the Aygo and its Peugeot and Citroën counterparts to be competent town cars.

A modified Aygo was also used on Fifth Gear to perform a twelve metre high loop the loop on a specially-designed track to determine if a stunt that can be done using Hot Wheels toys can be replicated in real life. The stunt was driven by stuntman Steve Truglia in May 2009.

In January 2010, the Aygo was part of a worldwide recall by Toyota for a faulty sticking accelerator pedal. It was found that under some circumstances, the pedal could stick in a partially depressed position, or return slowly to the off position. The recall affected the Aygo, Peugeot 107 and Citroën C1 models built between February 2005 and August 2009. Information from Toyota later suggested, however, that only Aygos with automatic gearboxes were affected, and that those with manual gearboxes were not.

2009–2012 (AB20) 
The Aygo received its first facelift, replacing the front bumper shape from the original, and changing the rear lights to a transparent appearance, from their original red tinted cluster.

2012–2014 (AB30) 
The Aygo received its second facelift, this time incorporating a much more angular bumper, and space for the inclusion of daytime running lights (DRL).

Reliability 
Breakdown statistics reported by the German Automobile Club in May 2010 placed the Aygo (which the data grouped with the Citroën C1 and Peugeot 107) at the top of the sub small car class, in respect of the low breakdown rates achieved for cars aged between one and four years.

Engines

Safety

"Aygo Crazy" concept 

In 2008, Toyota created a driveable one off concept car based on the Toyota Aygo. Named the Aygo Crazy, it was unveiled to the public at the July 2008 British International Motor Show in London, before appearing at other motor shows that year based in the United Kingdom.

The Aygo Crazy has a mid mounted 1.8 litre VVTi engine from the Toyota MR2 and Celica, mated to an MR2 five speed gearbox and fitted with a Toyota Motorsport turbocharger conversion. The manufacturer claims the engine produces  at 6,700 rpm and  torque at 3,400 rpm.

Unlike the standard Aygo, it has no driver aids, power steering or anti lock brakes but its rear wheel drive layout helps traction under heavy acceleration.

Exterior modifications include wider arches to accommodate the one inch of extra track, 17 inch alloy wheels with Goodyear tyres and a carbon fibre rear spoiler designed for the  American Champ Car series.

Suspension is from the MR2, with adjustable Tein shock absorbers and MacPherson struts front and rear. To cope with the extra power, Toyota upgraded the standard  front brake discs to a  Brembo conversion, with  ventilated rear discs replacing the  drums normally found on the Aygo. An uprated Helix clutch is also used.

The interior features a partial roll cage for extra chassis comfort and driver protection. Two specially designed sports seats, trimmed in red and black, and a suede rimmed Sparco steering wheel complete the race-inspired look.

Toyota claims the Aygo Crazy cost  to build.

BYD F0
Since 2008, the Chinese car manufacturer BYD Auto has produced the BYD F0, an unlicensed clone of the Toyota Aygo.

Second generation (AB40; 2014) 

Toyota revealed a completely redesigned Aygo at the March 2014 Geneva International Motor Show with the slogan 'go fun yourself'. The design was attributed to Japanese youth culture, inspired by Japanese manga robot Astro Boy and an egg in a box and has aims to make the Aygo more accessible to younger drivers, and allow for a greater level of customisability. It began rolling off the production line on 27 May 2014.

Models include:
 Aygo x – base model, with electric front windows, wing mirrors and daytime running lights
 Aygo x-play – in addition to 'x' – manual AC, Bluetooth connectivity and steering wheel controls
 Aygo x-pression – in addition to 'x-play' – 15-inch silver alloys, part leather seats, 'x-touch' seven-inch multimedia system, DAB+ radio, front fog lights and rear view reversing camera
 Aygo x-cite – (special edition) – in addition to 'x-pression' – 15-inch gloss black alloys and optional 'x-nav'
 Aygo x-clusiv – (special edition) – in addition to 'x-pression' – 15-inch machined alloys, climate control AC, optional 'x-nav' and smart entry and start
 Aygo x-pure – (special edition) – in addition to 'x-pression' - (minus the part leather seats) comes in Pure White colour with silver trim 'X' and back bumper, white machined alloys and privacy glass in the back.

The Aygo also includes numerous safety features such as vehicle stability control (VSC), anti lock braking system (ABS), hill start assist control (HAC) and supplemental restraint system (SRS) with six airbags.

2018–2021 
The refreshed second generation Aygo was unveiled at the March 2018 Geneva International Motor Show. and features a new front bumper, headlights, tail lights and engine.

Sales

References

External links 

 

Aygo
Cars introduced in 2005
2010s cars
2020s cars
City cars
Hatchbacks
Front-wheel-drive vehicles
Euro NCAP superminis
Cars of the Czech Republic